Publius Cornelius Lentulus was the name of a number of notable Romans:
Publius Cornelius Lentulus Scipio, Roman senator, suffect consul in 24
Publius Cornelius Lentulus Sura, Catiline conspirator
Publius Cornelius Lentulus Spinther, provincial governor and a friend of Cicero

See also
Publius Lentulus